Streptomyces castelarensis is a bacterium species from the genus of Streptomyces which has been isolated from dust in Castelar in Argentina. Streptomyces castelarensis produces camphomycin.

See also 
 List of Streptomyces species

References

Further reading

External links
Type strain of Streptomyces castelarensis at BacDive -  the Bacterial Diversity Metadatabase

castelarensis
Bacteria described in 2008